This article is regarding all FC Seoul managers.

Statistics

Managerial history

Match results

※ Win%, Draw%, Lose%, GFA, GAA: Only K League regular season (included K League Championship) and League Cup matches are counted.
※ Penalty shoot-outs results in 1993, 1998, 1999, 2000 seasons are not counted by K League's principle of official statistics.

Honours

References
 FC Seoul Matchday Magazine

External links
 FC Seoul Official Website 

L2